Anaphosia parallela is a moth of the subfamily Arctiinae. It was described by George Thomas Bethune-Baker in 1911. It is found in Angola and the Democratic Republic of the Congo.

References

Moths described in 1911
Lithosiini
Insects of the Democratic Republic of the Congo
Insects of Angola
Moths of Africa